St. Anne's Church (Italian: Chiesa di Sant’Anna) located in Trani, Apulia in Italy, was built as the Scolagrande Synagogue during the medieval period; the structure houses now the Jewish Section of the Diocesan Museum of Trani.

History

The church building was one of four synagogues in Trani converted to churches in 1380, when the 310 Jews remaining in the city were forcibly converted to Christianity. The four confiscated synagogues were renamed Santa Maria in Scolanova (now the Scolanova Synagogue,) San Leonardo Abate, San Pietro Martire. San Pietro was later demolished. San Leonardo has undergone such extensive renovation that little of the synagogue building survives.
Originally known as the Scolagrande Synagogue, the building was renamed Santi Quirico e Giovita after it was confiscated for use as a church, and later renamed Sant'Anna.

A medieval plaque on the northern wall describes an early renovation of the synagogue: "In the year 5007 after the creation, this sanctuary was built by a group of friends of the congregation, with a high decorated dome, a window providing light and new doors for the closure; the floor relaid and seats installed for the choir. May their piety be remembered before Him Who dwells in the splendid heavens." The date translates to 1247 CE.

Architecture

The Scolagrande synagogue was an almost square, Byzantine-style domed, masonry building, 38 by 40 feet, formed by four huge arched walls supporting a 26-foot high dome. The arch of the western wall opens into a semi-circular niche supporting an arched dome thought to have once contained the bimah. This would have been an early version of the plan later widely adopted by Sephardic synagogues in which the bimah is on the western wall and the Ark on the eastern wall separated by the length of the room.

The church was restored in 1841, in 1880 and in 1978. It features paintings of scenes from the Hebrew Bible (Old Testament.)

References

Sources

Buildings and structures in Trani
Byzantine synagogues
Medieval synagogues
Synagogues in Italy
Conversion of non-Christian religious buildings and structures into churches
13th-century synagogues